Ptilophora is a genus of moths of the family Notodontidae The genus was described by Stephens in 1828.

Selected species
Ptilophora ala (Schintlmeister and Fang, 2001)
Ptilophora horieaurea Kishida and Kobayashi, 2002
Ptilophora jezoensis (Matsumura, 1920)
Ptilophora nanlingensis Chen L et al., 2010
Ptilophora nohirae Matsumura, 1920
Ptilophora plumigera (Denis & Schiffermüller, 1775)
Ptilophora rufula Kobayashi, 1994

References

Notodontidae